The Promenade at Coconut Creek is a  open-air upscale shopping center in Coconut Creek, Florida, a suburban city in Broward County. This LEED pre-certified development opened in November 2008.

Notably, a  Class A office building exists on the site with tenants that include Allstate Insurance, which occupies  of the building. In addition to numerous available parking spaces, the center also has two parking garages, one two stories tall, whereas the other has three. The center also offers one EV charger.

Anchors
DSW, Inc.
Lane Bryant
Chico's
Sephora
Silverspot Cinemas
Cooper's Hawk Winery & Restaurant

References

External links

Shopping malls established in 2008
Shopping malls in Broward County, Florida
Coconut Creek, Florida
2008 establishments in Florida